The Gubru are a fictional extraterrestrial race in David Brin's Uplift Universe series.  Their full name is Gubru ab-Gooksyu-ul-Kwackoo-ul-Okukoo.

General information
The Gubru are an avian-like species.  Most Gubru are neuter and white in plumage color, but after consumption of certain hormones, triads of Gubru begin a path toward gender and sexual maturity.  These triads are considered royalty, "Roost Masters" with the queens a deep red color, and the princes either blue or amber.  Both princes are required to fertilize a queen's eggs, and the queens are at the top of the hierarchy.  The Molt process to determine which member of the triad will become which gender, is a complex one.  Each has an assumed role as a Suzerain (of Beam and Talon, Propriety, or Cost and Caution), and in their search for a new policy consensus, the member whose ideas are most successful becomes the queen of the triad.

They are a conservative and fanatical race, among those who believe that military action is justified and necessary before the return of the Progenitors.  They are prominent among the races in the battle over Kithrup in Startide Rising.  In The Uplift War, they make an effort to force EarthClan to reveal the whereabouts of the starship Streaker by occupying Garth, one of Earth's colonies. Populated only with Humans and Neo-Chimps, with a few aliens resident as diplomats or observers, the result is a guerrilla war. 

David Brin
Fictional extraterrestrial life forms